Alfredo V. Bonfil is one of the communities in Benito Juárez Municipality, Quintana Roo, Mexico. It is effectively a commuter suburb of Cancún and is located just south of that city. Its population at the 2010 census was 14,900 inhabitants.

References

Populated places in Quintana Roo